The 1987 Australian 2.0 Litre Touring Car Championship was a CAMS sanctioned Australian motor racing title open to Group A Touring Cars of under 2.0 litre engine capacity. The title was contested over a four-round series and was won by Mark Skaife driving a Nissan Gazelle.

This was the second Australian 2.0 Litre Touring Car Championship to be awarded by the Confederation of Australian Motor Sport. The title would be revived in 1993 for that year only.

Calendar
The 1987 Australian 2.0 Litre Touring Car Championship was contested over a four-round series. 

 Six rounds had been scheduled, however two were cancelled.
 The Sandown round was held concurrently with Round 7 of the 1987 Australian Touring Car Championship.

Points system
Championship points were awarded at each round on the following basis:

Results

See also
1987 Australian Touring Car season

References

Australian 2.0 Litre Touring Car Championship
Touring Cars